Novi Banovci is a settlement in Serbia by the Danube River. It is situated in the Stara Pazova municipality, in the Srem District, in Vojvodina province. It is located 5 kilometers away from Batajnica and 20 km from the capital, Belgrade. Novi Banovci is situated on the Belgrade-Novi Sad route. It has a Serb ethnic majority and its population totals 9,443 people (2011 census).

Name
The name of the town in Serbian is plural.

History

Following the Roman conquest in the 1st century BC, the settlement was known as Burgenae. 

The village of Novi Banovci was established in 1790 and soon it turned into the first predominantly Lutheran village within the boundaries of the Military Frontier.

Novi Banovci experienced a constant population growth in the 20th century. A significant increase in the neighborhood's population occurred in the mid-1990s, caused by the large influx of refugees from the Yugoslav War, especially after the Oluja military action which forced almost 250,000 Serbs from Croatia into Serbia, and many of them settled at the outskirts of Belgrade.

Demographics 

Population of Novi Banovci according to the official censuses:

1948: 1,341 
1953: 1,451 
1961: 1,592
1971: 1,842
1981: 4,077 
1991: 6,354 
2002: 9,358 
2011: 9,443

See also
List of places in Serbia
List of cities, towns and villages in Vojvodina

References

Slobodan Ćurčić, Broj stanovnika Vojvodine, Novi Sad, 1996.

External links 

 Banovci web portal
 banovci.rs/photos/
 Novi Banovci - photos

Populated places in Syrmia
Roman towns and cities in Serbia